Borovan Knoll (‘Borovanska Mogila’ \bo-ro-'van-ska mo-'gi-la\) is the hill rising to 878 m on the west coast of Lindblad Cove on Trinity Peninsula, Antarctic Peninsula.  Situated 1.85 km east-southeast of Dragor Hill and 3.88 km south-southeast of Almond Point, which is formed by an offshoot of the hill.

The hill is named after the settlement of Borovan in northwestern Bulgaria.

Location
German-British mapping in 1996.

Maps
 Trinity Peninsula. Scale 1:250000 topographic map No. 5697. Institut für Angewandte Geodäsie and British Antarctic Survey, 1996.
 Antarctic Digital Database (ADD). Scale 1:250000 topographic map of Antarctica. Scientific Committee on Antarctic Research (SCAR), 1993–2016.

Notes

References
 Bulgarian Antarctic Gazetteer. Antarctic Place-names Commission. (details in Bulgarian, basic data in English)
 Borovan Knoll. SCAR Composite Antarctic Gazetteer

External links
 Borovan Knoll. Copernix satellite image

Hills of Trinity Peninsula
Bulgaria and the Antarctic